Gabriel Guarda (born Fernando Guarda Geywitz; 19 January 1928 – 23 October 2020), was a Chilean historian and architect.

Career
He studied architecture at the Catholic University of Chile. He was part of the editorial committee of the journal Historia after it was established in 1961. In 1984 he received the Chilean National History Award.

References

Chilean Benedictines
People from Valdivia
Historians of the Captaincy General of Chile
20th-century Chilean historians
20th-century Chilean male writers
21st-century Chilean historians
21st-century Chilean male writers
Pontifical Catholic University of Chile alumni
20th-century Chilean architects
Chilean architectural historians
1928 births
2020 deaths
20th-century Chilean male artists